Yingzhou Subdistrict is a subdistrict of Taijiang District, Fuzhou, Fujian, China.

See also 
 List of township-level divisions of Fujian

References 

Township-level divisions of Fujian
Fuzhou
Subdistricts of the People's Republic of China